Söllbach is a river of Bavaria, Germany. It flows into the Tegernsee, which is drained by the Mangfall, near Bad Wiessee.

See also
List of rivers of Bavaria

References

Rivers of Bavaria
Rivers of Germany